The Naruo Kinen (in Japanese: 鳴尾記念) is a Grade 3 middle-distance race for three-year-olds and older horses in the JRA. It is run over 2000 metres at Hanshin Racecourse in June. The race often serves as a trial race for the Takarazuka Kinen later in the month.

History

The first race was held in 1951. The race is held once a year was held twice a year from 1951 to 1953. The race was run over a variety of longer distances before being contested over 2000 metres for the first time in 1997. The distance was 1800 metres from 2006 to 2011.

The race was run at Chukyo Racecourse in 1959, and at Kyoto Racecourse in 1966, 1969 and 1990.

From 1955 to 1985, the race was for horses over 5 years old, however the requirement was changed to 4 years old in 1987.

Notable winners of the Naruo Kinen have included Ten Point, Bubble Gum Fellow, Tamamo Cross and Lovely Day.

Winners since 2000

Previous winners

1951: Takakurayama
1951 (autumn): Track O
1952: Hiro Homare
1952 (autumn): Queen Narubi
1953: Queen Narubi
1953 (autumn): Bostonian
1954: Royal Wood
1955: Royal Wood
1956: Sekai O
1957: Sekai O
1958: Sekai O
1959: Katsura Shuho
1960: Tokitsu Hiro
1961: Caesar
1962: Great Stan
1963: Ryu Forel
1964: Goukai
1965: Ballymoss Nisei
1966: Eight Crown
1967: Apo Onward
1968: Yama Pit
1969: Fine Rose
1970: New Kiminonawa
1971: Tama Hope
1972: Fi Dor
1973: Shinzan Misaki
1974: Strong Eight
1975: Naoki
1976: Taiho Hero
1977: Ten Point 
1978: Erimo George
1979: Captain Namura
1980: Lindo Pleben
1981: Hashi Kranz    
1982: Marubutsu Winner
1983: Kyoei Ascent
1984: Hashi Rodi  
1985: Nishino Raiden
1986: Ron Spark
1987: Tamamo Cross     
1988: Yaeno Muteki
1989: Mr. Cyclennon
1990: Kachiuma Hawk
1991: Nice Nature
1992: Takeno Velvet
1993: Ruble Act
1994: Star Man
1995: Kanetsu Cross
1996: Maruka Diesis
1997: Bubble Gum Fellow
1998: Sunrise Flag
1999: Suehiro Commander

See also
 Horse racing in Japan
 List of Japanese flat horse races

References

Horse races in Japan